Kosuge Mari (born 16 October 1975) is a Japanese artistic gymnast. She placed 17th in the individual all-around at the 1992 Summer Olympics. At the 1994 Asian Games in Hiroshima, she won silver with her team.

Competition history
*A '*' means the ranking is based on qualification results and that the gymnast did not qualify for the all-around or event final.

References

External links
 

1975 births
Living people
Japanese female artistic gymnasts
Olympic gymnasts of Japan
Gymnasts at the 1992 Summer Olympics
Asian Games medalists in gymnastics
Asian Games silver medalists for Japan
Gymnasts at the 1990 Asian Games
Gymnasts at the 1994 Asian Games
Medalists at the 1990 Asian Games
Medalists at the 1994 Asian Games
Gymnasts from Tokyo
20th-century Japanese women
21st-century Japanese women